Blago may refer to:

Given name "Blago" or "Благо"
 Blago Barbieri (1923-1987), a Yugoslav swimmer
 Blago Zadro (1944-1991), a Croatian military commander

Nicknamed "Blago"
 Rod Blagojevich (born 1956), the former Governor of Illinois (2003-2009) impeached and later found guilty on corruption charges in 2010, whose sentence was commuted by President Trump in 2020 and released.

See also

 
 
 Primetime Blago, a former talk show segment on the radio program The Roe Conn Show